Soukias Hacob Koorkchian (born March 10, 1954, in  Tehran),better known by his pen name Varand is an Iranian poet, playwright, lyricist, author, translator and painter of Armenian descent. He has published 27 collections of poetry since 1972.

Varand was honoured as Professor of Armenian Literature by the Grigor Lusavoritch University of Etchmiadzin, Armenia in 2001. He translates both Persian classics as well as modern poetry into the Armenian language.

Varand was the chairman of the Armenian Writers Society of Iran founded in 1961 for over ten years, while recently elected chairman of the board for the organization. He also is the editor in charge of the cultural department at Armenian daily newspaper of “Alik”, an honorary member of the Writers Union of Armenia in Yerevan and the professor of the Armenian literature at Azad University of Foreign Languages in Tehran.

Works

 The Road of The Sun (1972) Tehran
 Riders of Destiny (1973) Tehran
 Evolution (1975) Beirut
 Firewinds (1978) Tehran
 Opal (1978) Tehran
 King And The Lion-Killer (1979) Tehran
 Sidharta (1980) Free Verse Tehran
 Sword And Shadow (1982) Tehran
 Bohemian Diary (1988) Tehran
 Roses of Sin (1989) Tehran
 Whispers of Beyond (1989) In Persian language Tehran
 New Age of Nemesis (1993) Yerevan
 John, Verse 14 (1994) Poems Tehran
 Mirage (1998) Antelias
 Leave of No Return (1999) Tehran
 The Great Torchbearer (2000) Composition Tehran
 From Tears To Remnant (2000) Selection Tehran
 Beheading (2003) Yerevan
 Warm Shadows (2003) Yerevan
 Autumn in Flight (2004) In Persian language Tehran
 King And The Lion-Killer (2004) 2nd Edition Antelias
 Bold (2005) 3 Poem Collection Tehran
 Tango 21: Love Leafs (2005) Yerevan
 Mask And Mirror (2007) Tehran
 These Eyes (2008) Tehran
 The Sun of Iran In My Soul (2009) Persian Poetry Translations Yerevan
 The Epical Hayk  Hayk Dyutsazn (2009) Tehran

Collection Titles In Armenian
1- Արեւի ճամբով 1972 Թեհրան
2- Արշաւանք (պոէմ) 1973 Թեհրան
3- Հոլովոյթ 1975 Բէյրութ
4- Հողմ հրոց (պոէմ) 1978 Թեհրան
5- Արեւաքար 1978 Թեհրան
6- Շիրխորն ու շահը (պոէմ) 1979 Թեհրան
7- Սիդհարտա (պոէմ-ազատ փոխառութիւն) 1980 Թեհրան
8- Սուր եւ ստւեր 1982 Թեհրան
9- Բոհեմական օրագիր 1988 Թեհրան
10- Մեղքի վարդեր 1989 Թեհրան
11- Անդէնական շշունջներ (պրսկ.) 1989 Թեհրան
12- Նոր նեմեզիդա (պոէմ) 1993 Երեւան
13- Յովհաննու-14 (պոէմներ) 1994 Թեհրան
14- Կրկներեւոյթ (Միրաժ) 1998 Անթիլիաս
15- Անվերադարձ 1999 Թեհրան
16- Մեծ ջահակիրը (կոմպոզիցիա) 2000 Թեհրան
17- Փրփուրից մրուր (ընտրանի) 2000 Թեհրան
18- Գլխատում (պոէմ) 2003 Երեւան
19- Ջերմ ստւերներ 2003 Երեւան
20- Սաւառնող աշուն (պրսկ.) 2004 Թեհրան
21- Շիրխորն ու շահը (Առիւծասպանն ու արքան) (Բ տպագրութիւն) 2004Անթիլիաս
22- Սխրատեսիլ (երեք պոէմա) 2005 Թեհրան
23- Տանգօ 21: Սիրային էջեր 2005 Երեւան
24- Դիմակ եւ հայելի 2007 Թեհրան
25- Այս աչքերը 2008 Թեհրան
26- Իմ յոգում արեվն է Իրանի… 2009 Երեւան
27- Հայկ Դիւցազն  Ձօն՝ Հայաստանի անկախութեան  4500-ամեակին  2009 Թեհրան

References

External links
 Varand Now On Podcast
 A Complete Illustrated List of Varand Books
 Varand Poems In Armenian - TANGO 21 - The Love Leafs / Տանգօ 21, Սիրային Էջեր (2005)
 Varand Poetry Translations Into English/French By Tatul Sonentz
 ՀԱՅԿ ԴԻՒՑԱԶՆ (Hayk Dyutsazn (2009)
 Writers' Union of Armenia Official Website
 Armenian Poetry Project - Varand
 Barker (reading Armenian poetry in English), Varand (Iran - Poetry)
 Armenian Writers' Conference In Diaspora
 

20th-century Iranian poets
Iranian translators
Iranian people of Armenian descent
People from Tehran
1954 births
Living people
Armenian academics
Iranian academics
Male poets
21st-century Iranian poets
Poets from Tehran